Reed Union School District (RUSD) is a California school district located in Tiburon, California. There are three schools in the district:

Reed Primary/Elementary School 
Reed Primary/Elementary School is located in Tiburon, California. Its principal is Mary Niesyn. Its grades are K-2. Some teachers are: Kindergarten: Ms. Johnson.  1st grade: Ms. Ryan. 2nd grade: Ms. Lopez. Mascot is: Reed Raccoon. Motto is: Nurture-Teach-Inspire

Bel Aire Elementary School 
Bel Aire Elementary School is also located in Tiburon, California. Its principal is John Dicosmo. Some teachers are: 3rd grade: Ms. Chitsaz. 4th grade: Mr Sanchez. 5th grade: Ms. McDonald. Mascot is the Bel Aire Bear. Motto is: Safe-Kind-Fair  Its grades are 3–5.

Del Mar Middle School 
Del Mar Middle School is a middle school ALSO located in Tiburon. Its principal is Chad Stuart and the assistant principal is Michael Song. Its grades are 6–8. Its mascot is the Del Mar Dragon.

References

External links
 

School districts in Marin County, California
1887 establishments in California
School districts established in 1887